Ricky Anderson (born January 24, 1963) is a former American football punter who played college football at Vanderbilt University and attended Lakewood High School in St. Petersburg, Florida. He was drafted by the St. Louis Cardinals in the eleventh round of the 1985 NFL Draft. He was a consensus All-American in 1984 as a punter. Anderson also played placekicker for the Commodores. He was also a first-team All-SEC selection in 1984.

References

External links
College stats

Living people
1963 births
Players of American football from St. Petersburg, Florida
American football punters
Vanderbilt Commodores football players
All-American college football players
National Football League replacement players